Acraga hamata is a moth of the family Dalceridae. It is found in Costa Rica, Panama and possibly Colombia. The habitat consists of tropical premontane wet and rain forests at altitudes above 800 meters.

The length of the forewings is 14–16 mm for males and 21 mm for females. The forewings are bright light yellow and the hindwings are yellow (lighter than the forewings) with a whitish costal margin. Adults are on wing from May to February.

References

Dalceridae
Moths described in 1910